Chronoxenus butteli is an Indonesian ant of the genus Chronoxenus. It was once considered to be a part of the genus Iridomyrmex, and was moved from there to Chronoxenus. It was described by Forel in 1913.

References

Dolichoderinae
Hymenoptera of Asia
Insects of Asia
Insects described in 1913